Miss Tanzania is a national Beauty pageant in Tanzania.

History
Miss Tanzania started in the 1967 and the participants for the most part were from Dar es Salaam, the winners were however not sent to compete internationally. In 1968, the government banned beauty contests in the country after advice from the ruling political party's youth league citing it was not consistent with Tanzanian culture.

In 1994 when beauty contests were allowed, the country had its first Miss Tanzania who competed in the Miss World.

Tanzania ended its decade-long drought of shining in international beauty contests in Miss World 2005, when Nancy Sumari was among the top 6 finalists and also crowned Miss World Africa.

Titleholders

The winner of Miss Tanzania represents her country at the Miss World. On occasion, when the winner does not qualify (due to age) a runner-up is sent.

See also
 Miss Universe Tanzania

References

External links
Miss Tanzania's Official website

Beauty pageants in Tanzania
1960s establishments in Tanzania
Tanzanian awards